Chandrakona II is a community development block that forms an administrative division in Ghatal subdivision of Paschim Medinipur district in the Indian state of West Bengal.

Geography

In Chandrakona II CD block is a flat deltaic country intersected by numerous rivers and water courses. 100% of the cultivated area has highly productive alluvial soil.

Chandrakona II CD block is bounded by Garhbeta I and Chandrakona I CD blocks in the north, Chandrakona I CD block in the east, Keshpur CD block in the south and Garhbeta III CD block in the west.

It is located 47 km from Midnapore, the district headquarters.

Chandrakona II CD block has an area of 150.44 km2. It has 1 panchayat samity, 6 gram panchayats, 86 gram sansads (village councils), 131 mouzas and 122 inhabited villages. Chandrakona police station serves this block. Headquarters of this CD block is at Chandrakona.

Chandrakona II CD block had a forest cover of 1,050 hectares, against a total geographical area of 17,982 hectares in 2005-06.

Gram panchayats of Chandrakona II block/ panchayat samiti are: Bandipur I, Bandipur II, Basanchhora, Bhagabantapur I, Bhagabantapur II and Kuapur.

Demographics

Population
According to the 2011 Census of India Chandrakona II CD block had a total population of 123,269, all of which were rural. There were 63,180 (51%) males and 60,089 (49%) females. Population in the age range 0–6 years was 15,231. Scheduled Castes numbered 37,330 (30.28%) and Scheduled Tribes numbered 6,841 (5.55%).

As per the 2001 census, Chandrakona II block had a total population of 106,586, out of which 54,504 were males and 52,083 were females. Chandrakona II block registered a population growth of 18.85 per cent during the 1991-2001 decade. Decadal growth for the combined Midnapore district was 14.87 per cent. Decadal growth in West Bengal was 17.45 per cent.

Large villages (with 4,000+ population) in Chandrakona II CD block are (2011 census figures in brackets): Krishnapur (6,083), Murakata (4,411), Jhakra (4,993) and Bala (4,604). 
 
Other villages in Chandrakona II CD block included (2011 census figures in brackets): Basanchhara (2,128), Bandipur (2,829), Jayantipur (613) and Baikunthapur (877).

Literacy
As per the 2011 census the total number of literate persons in Chandrakona II CD block was 83,145 (76.96% of the population over 6 years) out of which males numbered 46,086 (83.09% of the male population over 6 years) and females numbered 37,059 (70.49% of the female population over 6 years). The gender gap in literacy rates was 12.60%.
 
See also – List of West Bengal districts ranked by literacy rate

Language and religion
According to the District Census Handbook, Paschim Medinipur, 2011 census, as of 2001, Bengali was the mother-tongue of 90.5% of the population of Paschim Medinipur district, followed by Santali (4.6%), Hindi (1.4%), Kurmali Thar (0.7%), Urdu (0.6%), Telugu (0.6%), Odia (0.4%), Mundari (0.2%), Koda/ Kora (0.1%), Munda (0.1%) and Nepali (0.1%). There were people, forming lesser proportion of population, having other languages as mother-tongue. People with other mother-tongues formed 0.7% of the population.

According to the West Bengal Official Language Act 1961 and the West Bengal Official Language (Amendment Act) 2012, the Bengali language is to be used for official purposes in the whole of West Bengal. In addition to Bengali, the Nepali language is to be used for official purposes in the three hills subdivisions, namely Darjeeling, Kalimpong and Kurseong, in the district of Darjeeling, and Urdu is to be used for official purposes in district/subdivision/ block/ municipality where the population speaking Urdu exceeds 10% of the total population.  The English language will continue to be used for official purposes as it was being used prior to the enactment of these laws.

The West Bengal Official Language (Second Amendment) Bill, 2012, included Hindi, Santhali, Odiya and Punjabi as official languages if it is spoken by a population exceeding 10 per cent of the whole in a particular block or sub-division or a district.  Subsequently, Kamtapuri, Rajbanshi and Kurmali were also included in the list of minority languages by the West Bengal Official Language (Second Amendment) Bill, 2018. However, as of 2020, there is no official / other reliable information about the areas covered. Census 2011 provides language data only at the district and above level.

In the 2011 census Hindus numbered 96,425 and formed 78.22% of the population in Chandrakona II CD block. Muslims numbered 25,442 and formed 20.64% of the population. Others numbered 1,402 and formed 1.14% of the population. Others include Addi Bassi, Marang Boro, Santal, Saranath, Sari Dharma, Sarna, Alchchi, Bidin, Sant, Saevdharm, Seran, Saran, Sarin, Kheria, Christians and other religious communities.

BPL families
In Chandrakona II CD block 41.84% families were living below poverty line in 2007.

According to the District Human Development Report of Paschim Medinipur: The 29 CD blocks of the district were classified into four categories based on the poverty ratio. Nayagram, Binpur II and Jamboni CD blocks have very high poverty levels (above 60%). Kharagpur I, Kharagpur II, Sankrail, Garhbeta II, Pingla and Mohanpur CD blocks have high levels of poverty (50-60%), Jhargram, Midnapore Sadar, Dantan I, Gopiballavpur II, Binpur I, Dantan II, Keshiari, Chandrakona I, Gopiballavpur I, Chandrakona II, Narayangarh, Keshpur, Ghatal, Sabang, Garhbeta I, Salboni, Debra and Garhbeta III CD blocks have moderate levels of poverty (25-50%) and Daspur II and Daspur I CD blocks have low levels of poverty (below 25%).

Economy

Infrastructure
121 or 92% of mouzas in Chandrakona II CD block were electrified by 31 March 2014. 
 
122 mouzas in Chandrakona II CD block had drinking water facilities in 2013-14. There were 73 fertiliser depots, 149 seed stores and 29 fair price shops in the CD block.

Agriculture

Although the Bargadari Act of 1950 recognised the rights of bargadars to a higher share of crops from the land that they tilled, it was not fully implemented. Large tracts, beyond the prescribed limit of land ceiling, remained with the rich landlords. From 1977 onwards major land reforms took place in West Bengal. Land in excess of land ceiling was acquired and distributed amongst the peasants. Following land reforms land ownership pattern has undergone transformation. In 2013-14, persons engaged in agriculture in Chandrakona II CD block could be classified as follows: bargadars 8.41%, patta (document) holders 30.43%, small farmers (possessing land between 1 and 2 hectares) 2.94%, marginal farmers (possessing land up to 1 hectare) 18.89% and agricultural labourers 39.34%.

In 2005-06 the nett cropped area in Chandrakona II CD block was 13,100 hectares and the area in which more than one crop was grown was 9,326 hectares.

The extension of irrigation has played a role in growth of the predominantly agricultural economy. In 2013-14, the total area irrigated in Chandrakona II CD block was 10,900 hectares, out of which 1,200 hectares were irrigated by tank water, 5,750 hectares by deep tubewells, 2,000 hectares by shallow tubewells, 150 hectares by river lift irrigation and 1,800 hectares by other methods.

In 2013-14, Chandrakona II CD block produced 3,001 tonnes of Aman paddy, the main winter crop, from 2,462 hectares, 5,663 tonnes of Boro paddy (spring crop) from 1,794 hectares, 19 tonnes of wheat from 9 hectares and 145,235 tonnes of potatoes from 7,805 hectares. It also produced pulses and oilseeds.

Banking
In 2013-14, Chandrakona II CD block had offices of 6 commercial banks and 1 gramin bank.

Transport
Chandrakona II CD block has 13 ferry services and 7 originating/ terminating bus routes.

The Kharagpur-Adra line of South Eastern Railway passes through this CD block and there is a station at Chandrakona Road.

Communication

Website
Chandrakona II development block launched its Official website http://www.chandrakona2.in/, in association with Chandrakona II Panchayet Samity on 5 July 2012 at Chandrakona Town Hall. Namita Dey, Saha-sabhadhipati, Paschim Medinipur Zilla Parishad, inaugurated the website. Anshuman Adhikary, SDO Ghatal, Mamata Chowdhury, Sabhapati, Chandrakona II Panchayet Samity, Saikat Hazra, BDO - Chandrakona II Dev. Block, Ashek Rahman, BDO Chandrakona I Dev. Block, Debabrata Roy, BDO Ghatal, graced this occasion. A felicitation ceremony with the toppers of each school/ madrasha, under Chandrakona II Dev. Block and Chandrakona municipal area, in madhyamik exam'12, higher secondary exam'12 and high madrasah exam'12, was organized simultaneously on that stage as a part of the website launching programme.

Education
In 2013-14, Chandrakona II CD block had 110 primary schools with 8,017 students, 9 middle schools with 533 students, 9 high schools with 3,861 students and 9 higher secondary schools with 9,799 students. Chandrakona II CD block had 1 technical/ professional institution with 105 students and 215 institutions for special and non-formal education with 9,272 students. Chandrakona municipal town had 1 general college (outside the CD block).

The United Nations Development Programme considers the combined primary and secondary enrolment ratio as the simple indicator of educational achievement of the children in the school going age. The infrastructure available is important. In Chandrakona II CD block out of the total 110 primary schools in 2008-2009, 38 had pucca buildings, 21 partially pucca, 1 kucha and 50 multiple type.

Chandrakona Vidyasagar Mahavidyalaya is the general degree college in this block.

Culture
The Chandrakona II CD block has two heritage temples.

Healthcare
In 2014, Chandrakona II CD block had 1 rural hospital, 2 primary health centres and 1 private nursing home with total 74 beds and 13 doctors. It had 23 family welfare sub centres and 1 family welfare centre. 10,773 patients were treated indoor and 143,838 patients were treated outdoor in the hospitals, health centres and subcentres of the CD block.

Chandrakona Rural Hospital, with 60 beds at Chandrakona, is the major government Chandrakona II CD block. There are primary health centres at: Basanchora (PO Chhatraganj) (with 10 beds) and Bhagabantapur (with 4 beds).

References

Community development blocks in Paschim Medinipur district